Elections to Sheffield City Council were held on 5 May 1994. One third of the council was up for election. Since the previous election, three by-elections had taken place, resulting in two Lib Dem gains from Labour in Brightside and Walkley and a successful hold of a Dore seat by the Conservatives. This, along with a defection from Burngreave councillor James Jamison, left Labour down three, the Liberal Democrats up two and the Conservatives unchanged going into this election.

Election result

|- style="background-color:#F9F9F9"
! style="background-color: " |
| Militant Labour
| align="right" | 0
| align="right" | 0
| align="right" | 0
| align="right" | 0
| align="right" | 0.0
| align="right" | 0.4
| align="right" | 682
| align="right" | +0.4
|-

This result had the following consequences for the total number of seats on the council after the elections:

Ward results

Alfred Meade was a sitting councillor for Stocksbridge ward

|- style="background-color:#F9F9F9"
! style="background-color: " |
| Militant Labour
| Kenneth Douglas
| align="right" | 682
| align="right" | 20.6
| align="right" | +20.6
|-

References

1994 English local elections
1994
1990s in Sheffield